This is a list of administrators and governors of Kwara. Kwara, Nigeria, was formed on 27 May 1967 when the Northern region was split into Benue-Plateau, Kano, Kwara, West Central, North-Eastern and North-Western states;

See also 
 States of Nigeria
 List of state governors of Nigeria

References

Governors
Kwara